The 2016–17 St. Bonaventure Bonnies women's basketball team represented the St. Bonaventure University during the 2016–17 NCAA Division I women's basketball season. The Bonnies, led by first year head coach Jesse Fleming, played their home games at Reilly Center and are members of the Atlantic 10 Conference. They finished the season 9–21, 4–12 in A-10 play to finish in a tie for eleventh place. They lost in the first round of the A-10 women's tournament to La Salle.

2016–17 media
All non-televised Bonnies home games will air on the A-10 Digital Network. WGWE will continue to be the radio broadcaster for the team. Chris Russell will replace the retiring Mike "Smitty" Smith as the team's play-by-play voice; no color commentator is used.

Roster

Schedule

|-
!colspan=9 style="background:#7B3F00; color:#FFFFFF;"| Exhibition

|-
!colspan=9 style="background:#7B3F00; color:#FFFFFF;"| Non-conference regular season

|-
!colspan=9 style="background:#7B3F00; color:#FFFFFF;"| Atlantic 10 regular season

|-
!colspan=9 style="background:#7B3F00; color:#FFFFFF;"| Atlantic 10 Tournament

Rankings
2016–17 NCAA Division I women's basketball rankings

See also
 2016–17 St. Bonaventure Bonnies men's basketball team

References

Saint Bonaventure
St. Bonaventure Bonnies women's basketball seasons